Jason was an American sounding rocket with 5 stages. The Jason was launched 22 times in 1958. The Jason could carry a payload of 125 pounds (57 kg) to an altitude of 500 mi (800 km). The launch thrust was 82,100 pounds-force (365 kN), the launch mass 7,340 lb (3330 kg), the diameter 58 centimeters (23 in) and the length 17.5 meters (57 ft).

Also known as Argo E-5, this research vehicle was made by Aerolab for the Air Force (AFSWC) for use in the Jason program, which measured the trapped radiation from the Argus nuclear tests in the latter half of 1958. It was launched from Cape Kennedy, Wallops, and Puerto Rico.  It consisted of an Honest John first stage plus a Nike stage plus another Nike stage plus a Recruit stage plus a T-55 as the fifth stage.

References

External links 

 NASA History Office

Sounding rockets of the United States
1958 in spaceflight